Fabio Panetta (born 1 August 1959) is an Italian economist and central banker who has been serving as a member of the Executive Board of the European Central Bank since 2020. He previously served as Senior Deputy Governor of the Bank of Italy and concurrently as President of the Institute for the Supervision of Insurance (IVASS) from 10 May to 31 December 2019.

Early life and education 
The son of the former mayor of Pescosolido (Frosinone), Paolino Panetta, Panetta was born in Rome in 1959. After graduating with honours in Economics from LUISS University (Rome) in 1982, he obtained an M.Sc. in Monetary Economics from the London School of Economics and a Ph.D in Economics and Finance from the London Business School.

Career 
Panetta joined the Bank of Italy's Research Department in 1985, becoming Head of its Monetary and Financial Division in 1999. From 2007 to 2011 he headed the Economic Outlook and Monetary Policy Department. In July 2011 he became Managing Director with the task of coordinating the Bank's activities relating to the Eurosystem.From 2010 to 2012 he was director in charge of the Financial Stability Report.

From 8 October 2012 to 9 May 2019 Panetta served as Deputy Director-General of the Bank of Italy, and immediately after he became Senior Deputy Governor of the Bank of Italy (Presidential Decree of 3 May 2019).He has held important positions and represented the Bank of Italy in numerous European and international institutions, including the OECD, the IMF, the G10, the ECB and the BIS. He is also a member of the directorate of the Bank of Italy and of the Institute for Insurance Supervision as well as a member of the board of directors of the Bank for International Settlements and substitute for the Governor on the ECB's Governing Council. He is also a member of the Supervisory Board of the Single Supervisory Mechanism which became fully operational on 4 November 2014.

From 1 January 2020 onward Panetta has been an Executive Board member at the European Central Bank, replacing the French Benoît Cœuré. He is responsible for the directorates dealing with International and European relations, with market infrastructure, payments and banknotes.

Panetta has a reputation among his colleagues for his staunch defense of Italian banking systems and an opponent of bail-in-rules.

Other activities
 Leibniz Institute for Financial Research (SAFE), Member of the Policy Council

Recognition
In December 2019 Panetta was awarded the honorary title of Knight Grand Cross of the Order of Merit of the Republic of Italy.

Personal life
Panetta is married and has three children

References 

1959 births
Executive Board of the European Central Bank members
Italian economists
Living people